E20 Norr may refer to:
European route E20 (or E20 North), northern part of the European route E20
"E20 Norr", a track released in 2003 on the "Battery Check" single by punk rock band Millencolin